Victor Hugo Mafla Vergara (born 7 January 1974) is a Colombian former professional footballer who played as a midfielder.

References

External links

1974 births
Living people
Colombian footballers
Association football midfielders
Categoría Primera A players
América de Cali footballers
Deportes Quindío footballers
Cortuluá footballers
Independiente Santa Fe footballers
Cúcuta Deportivo footballers
Club Alianza Lima footballers
Atlético Bucaramanga footballers
Shanghai Shenhua F.C. players
Deportivo Táchira F.C. players
C.D. FAS footballers
C.D. Chalatenango footballers
Colombian expatriate footballers
Colombian expatriate sportspeople in Peru
Expatriate footballers in Peru
Colombian expatriate sportspeople in China
Expatriate footballers in China
Colombian expatriate sportspeople in Venezuela
Expatriate footballers in Venezuela
Colombian expatriate sportspeople in El Salvador
Expatriate footballers in El Salvador
People from Palmira, Valle del Cauca
Sportspeople from Valle del Cauca Department
Footballers at the 1995 Pan American Games
Pan American Games bronze medalists for Colombia
Pan American Games medalists in football
Medalists at the 1995 Pan American Games
20th-century Colombian people
21st-century Colombian people